The Michael Johnson Album is the fourth studio album by American singer and songwriter Michael Johnson. It was released in 1978 on EMI.

Two singles were released from the album. "Bluer Than Blue" became the singer's first top 40 hit, reaching No. 12 on the Billboard Hot 100 chart in summer 1978. It also reached No. 10 on the Cash Box chart. "Almost Like Being in Love" became a top 10 Adult Contemporary hit in both the U.S. (no. 4) and Canada (no. 10).

Track listing
 "Sailing Without a Sail" – 3:47
 "Foolish" – 2:47
 "Dancin' Tonight" – 2:52
 "Two in Love" – 2:53
 "Ridin' in the Sky" – 3:10
 "Bluer Than Blue" – 2:54
 "Almost Like Being in Love" (Frederick Loewe) – 3:25
 "Words Or Less" – 2:57
 "Gypsy Woman" - 3:45
 "When You Come Home" - 3:11

Personnel
Michael Johnson - vocals, classical guitar on "Ridin' in the Sky" and "Gypsy Woman"
Steve Gibson, Jon Goin - guitar
Mike Leech, Jack Williams, Norbert Putnam - bass
Shane Keister - piano, electric piano, Moog and ARP synthesizer
Bobby Ogdin - organ, electric piano, Orgatron 
Bill LaBounty - piano, electric piano
Kenny Malone - drums
Farrell Morris - percussion
Sheri Kramer, Diane Tidwell, Lisa Silver - backing vocals
Roger Williams - saxophone
Buddy Skipper - arrangements, saxophone
Bergen White - arrangements
Buddy Skipper, Don Sheffield, Roger Bissell - horns
The Shelly Kurland Strings - strings on "When You Come Home"
Technical
Brent Maher, Rich Schirmer - recording
John Kosh - art direction, design
James M. Shea - photography

References

1978 albums
Michael Johnson (singer) albums
Albums produced by Brent Maher
EMI America Records albums